April in Love is a 2006 French comedy film directed by Gérald Hustache-Mathieu.

Cast 
 Sophie Quinton - Avril
 Miou-Miou - Sister Bernadette
 Nicolas Duvauchelle - Pierre
 Clément Sibony - David
 Richaud Valls - Jim
 Geneviève Casile - Mother Marie-Joseph
 Monique Mélinand - Sister  Céleste

References

External links 

2006 comedy films
2006 films
French comedy films
2000s French films
2000s French-language films